Author! Author! may refer to:

Literature 
 Author! Author! (book), autobiographical work by P. G. Wodehouse first published in 1953
 Author! Author! (short story), 1943 short story by Isaac Asimov
 Author, Author (novel), 2004 novel by David Lodge

Television 
 "Author, Author", series episode of Frasier (season 1)
 Author, Author (Star Trek: Voyager), series episode

Other fields 
 Author! Author! (album), 1981 album by the Scottish post-punk band Scars
 Author! Author! (film), 1982 film starring Al Pacino